Alberto Benito Correa (born 13 June 1992) is a Spanish professional footballer who plays as a right-back.

Club career
Born in Altafulla, Tarragona, Catalonia, Benito finished his development at Gimnàstic de Tarragona. He made his senior debut for the farm team in the 2010–11, in Tercera División.

Benito was promoted to Nàstic's first team in Segunda División B on 10 July 2012, although still being registered for the reserves. On 23 July 2013, he signed a two-year deal with fellow league team Sporting de Gijón B after his contract expired.

On 7 July 2015, free agent Benito agreed to a two-year contract with CF Reus Deportiu, still in the third division. He contributed 30 appearances (all as a starter) during the season, as the club achieved promotion to Segunda División.

Benito made his professional debut on 20 August 2016, starting and scoring in the last minute of a 1–0 away win against RCD Mallorca. He played a further 30 matches until the end of the campaign, helping to an 11th-place finish.

On 13 June 2017, Benito joined Real Zaragoza on a two-year deal. On 28 June 2019, he signed with fellow second division side Albacete Balompié for two seasons.

Benito split 2021–22 in the newly-created Primera División RFEF, with Deportivo de La Coruña and Cultural y Deportiva Leonesa.

References

External links

1992 births
Living people
People from Tarragonès
Sportspeople from the Province of Tarragona
Spanish footballers
Footballers from Catalonia
Association football defenders
Segunda División players
Segunda División B players
Tercera División players
Primera Federación players
CF Pobla de Mafumet footballers
Gimnàstic de Tarragona footballers
Sporting de Gijón B players
CF Reus Deportiu players
Real Zaragoza players
Albacete Balompié players
Deportivo de La Coruña players
Cultural Leonesa footballers